The 2009–10 North Carolina Tar Heels women's basketball team represented the University of North Carolina in the 2009–10 NCAA Division I women's basketball season. The Tar Heels were coached by Sylvia Hatchell. The Tar Heels played their home games at newly-renovated Carmichael Arena as members of the Atlantic Coast Conference.

Offseason
May 5: The Atlantic Coast Conference and the Big Ten Conference announced the pairings for the annual Big Ten/ACC Challenge for women's basketball, which is in its third year of a four-year agreement. The Tar Heels will face Michigan State in East Lansing, Mich., on December 3.
May 17: USA Basketball today announced the 14 finalists for the 2009 USA Women's U19 World Championship Team. North Carolina's Chay Shegog is among the finalists. The finalists will return to Colorado Springs on July 9 to begin training for the 2009 FIBA U19 World Championship, which will be held July 23-Aug. 2 in Bangkok, Thailand.
May 14:Tar Heels head coach Sylvia Hatchell and Atlantic Coast Conference commissioner John Swofford are among six honorees who will be inducted into the 2009 North Carolina Sports Hall of Fame.
July 30: The Women's Basketball Coaches Association (WBCA), on behalf of the Wade Coalition, announced the 2009-2010 preseason "Wade Watch" list for The State Farm Wade Trophy Division I Player of the Year. North Carolina senior forward Jessica Breland is one of 25 named to the list, which is made up of top NCAA Division I student-athletes who best embody the spirit of Lily Margaret Wade. This is based on the following criteria: game and season statistics, leadership, character, effect on their team and overall playing ability.
August 21: The 2009-10 preseason candidates list for the Women’s Wooden Award was released, naming 31 student athletes. Jessica Breland from North Carolina was one of the candidates.

Roster

Schedule & Results

Preseason

Regular season

References

External links
Official Site

North Carolina Tar Heels women's basketball seasons
North Carolina
North Carolina
North Car
North Car